Microvirga guangxiensis  is a Gram-negative, rod-shaped, strictly aerobic, non-spore-forming and non-motile bacteria from the genus of Microvirga which has been isolated from soil from a rice field in the Guangxi Province in China.

References

Further reading

External links
Type strain of Microvirga guangxiensis at BacDive -  the Bacterial Diversity Metadatabase

Hyphomicrobiales
Bacteria described in 2009